Heras is a monotypic snout moth genus described by Carl Heinrich in 1956. Its single species, Heras disjunctus, is found in Colombia.

References

Phycitinae
Monotypic moth genera
Moths of South America
Pyralidae genera
Taxa named by Carl Heinrich